The Angola Women's Junior National Handball Team represents Angola in international handball competitions and is controlled by the Federação Angolana de Andebol. At continental level, it competes at the African Women's Junior Handball Championship which qualifies for the IHF Women's Junior World Championship. Angola has been a member of the IHF since 1979.

Tournament record

World Championship

African Championship

Current squad
The following is the roster for the 2018 World Championship held in Debrecen, Hungary from 1–14 July 2018.

Technical team
 Edgar Neto Head coach
 Luís Chaves Assistant coach
 Maria Mateus Physician
 Graça Monteiro Physio
 Mauro Cassoma Manager

Players

2011–2018
A = African championship; = African championship winner;W = World cup

2000–2010
A = African championship; = African championship winner;W = World cup

Head coach positions
  Edgar Neto – 2016–2019
  Pedro Neto – 2015
  Alex Fernandes – 2013, 2014
  Quinteiro Teresa – 2012
  Tony Costa – 2011
  João Ricardo – 2010
  Nelson Catito – 2009
  Vivaldo Eduardo – 2002–2008
  João Ricardo – 2000, 2001

See also
 Angola women's national handball team
 Angola women's youth national handball team
 Angola women's junior basketball team

References

Women's national junior handball teams
Handball
Handball